is a Japanese footballer currently playing as a forward for Verspah Oita in JFL, on loan from Blaublitz Akita.

Career statistics

Club
.

Notes

Honours
 Blaublitz Akita
 J3 League (1): 2020

References

External links

1998 births
Living people
Association football people from Akita Prefecture
Japanese footballers
Association football forwards
Sapporo University alumni
J2 League players
J3 League players
Japan Football League players
Blaublitz Akita players
Verspah Oita players